Sico may refer to:

 Sico of Benevento or Sico I (c. 758–832), Prince of Benevento
 Sico of Salerno or Sico II (died 855), Prince of Salerno
 SICO Technology, an Egyptian manufacturer of mobile phones

See also
 Silicon carbonate, a chemical compound with formula SiCO4